Mahto or Mahato is a surname used by several castes and communities in the states of Bihar, Jharkhand, West Bengal, Uttar Pradesh  and Odisha in India. Mahato is also a popular surname in Nepal.
In the zamindari villages, "Mahto" was a title given to the headman of a village ward. The mahto's duties were to maintain peace in his area, and collect revenue for the zamindar (feudal landlord). 
In Chotanagpur plateau region of Jharkhand, including in the Oraon tribal society, Mahato was historically a title of the village chief.

The castes and communities that use Mahto, Mehto or Mahato as a surname, clan name or title include:

Notable people 

Notable people with the surname Mahto or Mahato include:
 
 
Abha Mahato (born 1964), Indian politician from Jharkhand
Aklu Ram Mahto (1940-2020), Indian politician from Jharkhand
Amit Mahto, Indian politician from Jharkhand
Ashwamedh Mahto (born 1967), Indian politician from Bihar
Baidyanath Prasad Mahto (born 1947), Indian politician from Bihar
Bandhu Mahto,Indian politician from Bihar
Baneswar Mahato, Indian politician from West Bengal
Banshilal Mahto (1940–2019), Indian politician from Chhattisgarh
Bhajahari Mahato (1911–2003),Indian politician from West Bengal
Bidyut Baran Mahato (born 1963), Indian politician from Jharkhand
Binod Bihari Mahato (1923–1991), Indian politician and advocate from Jharkhand
Bir Singh Mahato (1945–2021), Indian politician from West Bengal
Chanku Mahato (1816-1856), Indian freedom fighter(Santhal Rebellion). 
Chhatradhar Mahato (born 1964), Indian political activist from West Bengal
Chitta Mahato, Indian politician from West Bengal
Dhananjay Mahato (1919–2014), Indian freedom fighter, social activist, and politician from Jharkhand
Deepika Kumari Mahato (born 1994), Indian athlete from Jharkhand
Dulu Mahato Indian politician from Jharkhand
Jagannath Mahto, Indian politician from Jharkhand
Jagarnath Mahto, Indian politician from Jharkhand
Jagdish Mahto, communist activist and founder of Naxalism in Bihar 
Jaleshwar Mahato, Indian politician from Jharkhand
Jyotirmay Singh Mahato, Indian politician from West Bengal
Khiru Mahto (1953), Indian politician from Jharkhand 
Lambodar Mahto, Indian politician from Jharkhand
Lok Nath Mahato, Indian politician from Jharkhand
Mriganko Mahato (born 1963), Indian politician from West Bengal
Muga Lal Mahato, Nepalese politician
Narahari Mahato (born 1956), Indian politician from West Bengal
Nirmal Mahto (1950–1987), Indian politician from Jharkhand
Nepal Mahato, Indian politician from West Bengal
Pradeep Mahto, Indian politician from Bihar 
Purnima Mahato, Indian archer and archery coach from Jharkhand
Rabindra Nath Mahato, India Politician from Jharkhand, Speaker of Jharkhand Vidhan Sabha
Ramdeo Mahto, CPI(M) leader and six time MLA from Bihar.
Raghunath Mahato, Indian freedom fighter(Chuar Rebellion)
Raj Banshi Mahto, Indian politician from Bihar
Rajendra Mahato (born 1958), Nepalese politician
Raj Kishore Mahato, Indian politician from Jharkhand
Ram I. Mahato, Professor, Scientist and chairman of the Dept. of Pharmaceutical Sciences, University of Nebraska Medical Center,USA.
Ram Lakhan Mahato, (1947-2020) Indian politician from Bihar
Rambalak Mahto,(born 1924) Advocate General of the state of Bihar
Ram Prakash Mahto, politician from Bihar
Rameshwar Mahto, Indian politician from Bihar
Sagina Mahato, Indian Social activists and leader of labour movement 1942–43 from West Bengal 
Santiram Mahato, Indian politician from West Bengal
Satrudhan Mahato, Nepalese politician
Shailendra Mahato, Indian politician from Jharkhand
Sitaram Mahato, Nepalese Politician
Sudesh Mahto, Indian politician, Former deputy chief minister of Jharkhand
Sudhir Mahato,Indian politician, Former deputy chief minister of Jharkhand
Suman Mahato (born 1964), Indian politician from Jharkhand
Sunil Kumar Mahato (1966–2007), Indian politician from Jharkhand
Tek Lal Mahto, Indian politician from Jharkhand
Tooni Mahto,  marine biologist
Yogeshwar Mahto, Indian politician from Jharkhand

References 

Surnames of Nepalese origin
Hindu surnames